East Riding of Yorkshire was a parliamentary constituency covering the East Riding of Yorkshire, omitting Beverley residents save a small minority of Beverley residents who also qualified on property grounds to vote in the county seat (mainly business-owning forty shilling freeholders).  It returned two Members of Parliament to the House of Commons of the Parliament.  A brief earlier guise of the seat covered the changed franchise of the First Protectorate Parliament and Second Protectorate Parliament during a fraction of the twenty years of England and Wales (Scotland and Ireland) as a republic.

First and Second Protectorate parliaments existence 1654-1658
The seat existed for the June 1654 to January 1655 parliament and for that following (July 1656 to September 1656).  The East Riding electorate summoned four members simultaneously.

Creation and abolition
The constituency was created by the Reform Act 1832 as the four-seat Yorkshire was divided in three, two-seat divisions for the 1832 general election. The divisions were abolished by the Redistribution of Seats Act 1885.  It was replaced for the 1885 general election by single-member seats: Buckrose, Holderness and Howdenshire.

Summary of results
Candidates were elected unopposed at most of the elections throughout its existence; contested elections took place in 1837, 1868 and 1880. In these contests two Conservative candidates defeated a single Whig or Liberal.

Members of Parliament

MPs 1654–1658 (Protectorate Parliaments)

MPs 1832–1885

Election results

Elections in the 1830s

Elections in the 1840s

Elections in the 1850s
Broadley's death caused a by-election.

Duncombe was appointed a Lord Commissioner of the Admiralty, requiring a by-election.

Elections in the 1860s

Elections in the 1870s

Elections in the 1880s

References 

Parliamentary constituencies in Yorkshire and the Humber (historic)
Constituencies of the Parliament of the United Kingdom established in 1832
Constituencies of the Parliament of the United Kingdom disestablished in 1885
East Riding of Yorkshire